Gennady Veniaminovich Bessonov (born 28 April 1954) is a retired Russian heavyweight weightlifter who won world titles in 1977 and 1979. In 1981 he set three world records: one in the snatch and two in the clean and jerk. He retired in 1983 due to progressing back and hip injuries and became a police officer in his native Shakhty. In 1991 he graduated from the National Internal Affairs Academy, and from 1994 to 2005 headed a police department in Rostov Oblast. He retired from the police force in 2005 in the rank of colonel, and after that worked for the Shakhty City Administration.

References

1954 births
Living people
Russian male weightlifters
European Weightlifting Championships medalists
World Weightlifting Championships medalists
People from Shakhty
Sportspeople from Rostov Oblast
20th-century Russian people
21st-century Russian people